Hamzak (also Romanized as Ḩamzak) is a village in Shirin Su Rural District, Maneh District, Maneh and Samalqan County, North Khorasan Province, Iran. At the 2006 census, its population was 146, in 30 families. As of the 2016 census, the population is now 197, with 47 families.

References 

Populated places in Maneh and Samalqan County